was a monorail station in Inuyama, Aichi Prefecture, Japan.
It was closed on December 28, 2008, due to the end of the monorail operation.

Lines
Nagoya Railroad
Monkey Park Monorail Line

Layout
The station had one platform serving one track terminating at the station. The main gate of the station was per se the gate of Japan Monkey Park.

Adjacent stations

|-
!colspan=5|Nagoya Railroad

	

Railway stations in Japan opened in 1962
Railway stations in Aichi Prefecture
Defunct railway stations in Japan
Railway stations closed in 2008